"Taxloss" (sometimes stylised as "Taxlo$$") is a song by the English alternative rock band Mansun. The song was written by band-leader Paul Draper. It was produced by Draper and mixed by Mark 'Spike' Stent during sessions for the group's debut studio album. The song was edited down from over seven minutes to four and a half minutes released as a single in April 1997, the fifth single from the group's debut album, Attack of the Grey Lantern, and their sixth on a major-label. The single charted in the top twenty at #15 on the UK Singles Chart and continuing the group's run of four consecutive top twenty singles.

The single was supposed to be titled Six EP as part of the group's unique naming system, but was not labelled as such for unknown reasons. The single was released on two CDs and a 12" vinyl of remixes (a first for the group). Each remix is a major rework in Techno and Progressive Trance styles. The remixes were produced by John 'OO' Fleming, Lisa Marie Experience, Gaudi, and Slam, the latter of which appeared only on the Promo 12".

"Taxloss" was released as a special Fan club 7" vinyl single in December 1998. The single featured live versions of the song and "Everyone Must Win" recorded at Brixton Academy 23/10/1998 during the group's tour to support their second album Six.

Music video
On 17 April 1997, director Roman Coppola filmed the music video using hidden cameras to capture members of the video production crew (the band did not appear in the video) throwing £25,000 in £5 notes (each with a white sticker with the word "Taxlo$$" in red) from the upper concourse of Liverpool Street Station onto commuters below.  All this information is imparted in the finished music video which includes all the preparation for the stunt from the withdrawal of the cash through to the news reports after the event.  The ensuing chaos as the crowd scrambled for the cash was intended to highlight human greed.

Track listing

Personnel

Mansun
Dominic Chad – lead guitar, piano, backing vocals, synthesizer
Stove – bass
Andie Rathbone – drums
Paul Draper – vocals, guitars, piano, synthesizer

Production
Paul Draper - producer ("Taxloss", "The Impending Collapse of It All", "Wide Open Space (Acoustic)", "The Holy Blood and the Holy Grail")
Ian Caple - recording ("Taxloss")
Mike Hunter - recording ("Taxloss", "The Holy Blood and the Holy Grail"), engineer ("The Holy Blood and the Holy Grail")
Mark 'Spike' Stent - mixing ("Taxloss", "The Holy Blood and the Holy Grail")
Nick Griffiths - mixing and engineering ("Grey Lantern", "The Impending Collapse Of It All", "Wide Open Space (Acoustic)")
Ian Grimble - mixing ("Taxloss (Live)", "Everyone Must Win (Live)")
Pennie Smith - photography
Stylorouge London - artwork

Chart positions

References

1997 singles
Mansun songs
Songs written by Paul Draper (musician)
1997 songs
Parlophone singles